
Gmina Rutka-Tartak is a rural gmina (administrative district) in Suwałki County, Podlaskie Voivodeship, in north-eastern Poland, on the Lithuanian border.

The gmina contains part of the protected area called Suwałki Landscape Park.

Villages
Gmina Rutka-Tartak contains the villages and settlements of Baranowo, Bondziszki, Ejszeryszki, Folusz, Ignatowizna, Jałowo, Jasionowo, Jodoziory, Kadaryszki, Kleszczówek, Krejwiany, Kupowo, Lizdejki, Michałówka, Olszanka, Pobondzie, Polimonie, Postawele, Poszeszupie, Poszeszupie-Folwark, Potopy, Rowele, Rutka-Tartak, Sikorowizna, Smolnica, Smolniki, Trzcianka and Wierzbiszki.

Neighbouring gminas
Gmina Rutka-Tartak is bordered by the gminas of Jeleniewo, Szypliszki and Wiżajny. It also borders Lithuania.

References
 Polish official population figures 2006

Rutka-Tartak
Gmina Rutka Tartak